Robert Hicks or Bob Hicks may refer to:

 Barbecue Bob (1902–1931), early American blues musician born Robert Hicks
 Bob Hicks (activist) (1929–2010), American civil rights activist in Louisiana
 Bob Hicks (American football) (1921–2012), American college football coach
 Bobby Hicks (born 1933), American bluegrass fiddler
 Robert C. Hicks (1927–2018), American college football coach
 Robert Drew Hicks (1850–1929), English classical scholar
 Robert Hicks (American author) (1951–2022), American author and preservationist
 Robert Hicks (American football) (born 1974), NFL offensive tackle
 Robert Hicks (Australian footballer) (born 1991), Australian rules footballer
 Robert Hicks (British politician) (born 1938), British Conservative Member of Parliament for Cornish constituencies
 Robert Hicks (Canadian politician) (1933–2014), Canadian Progressive Conservative politician

See also
 Hicks (disambiguation)